The 2013 NBA playoffs was the postseason tournament of the National Basketball Association's 2012–13 season. The tournament concluded with the Eastern Conference champion Miami Heat defeating the Western Conference champion San Antonio Spurs 4 games to 3 in the NBA Finals. LeBron James was named NBA Finals MVP.

Overview
The Miami Heat headed into the playoffs with a franchise-best  66 wins, topping the league in the regular season. Their 2012 Finals opponents, the Oklahoma City Thunder, topped the Western Conference with 60 wins, making it the first time since 2006 that the two teams who faced off in the previous year's finals topped their respective conferences in the next regular season. 

This was also the final NBA Playoffs played under commissioner David Stern.

Western Conference
The San Antonio Spurs continued the longest active playoff streak at 16 straight appearances. The Dallas Mavericks missed the playoffs for the first time since 2000, ending the second-longest active streak of playoff appearances, which stretched 12 years. 

The Los Angeles Clippers made franchise history by winning their first Pacific Division title and having a 56-win season, tied with the Memphis Grizzlies, whose 56 wins were also a franchise record. However, home court advantage went to the Clippers by virtue of winning their division. Meanwhile, the Los Angeles Lakers entered their eighth consecutive postseason. However, this was their first appearance since 1996 without Kobe Bryant, as he was out with injury.

The Denver Nuggets entered their tenth consecutive postseason. They also earned the West's third seed and headed into the playoffs with a franchise-record 57 wins. 

The Golden State Warriors made their first playoff appearance since 2007, while the Houston Rockets made their first playoff appearance since 2009.

Eastern Conference
The Indiana Pacers won the Central Division for the first time since 2004, while the New York Knicks entered the playoffs with their best regular-season performance since , finishing atop the Atlantic Division for the first time since . The Knicks also opened the playoffs at home for the first time since 2001.

The Brooklyn Nets made the playoffs for the first time since 2007, when they were known as the New Jersey Nets, while the Milwaukee Bucks appeared for the first time since 2010. The Bucks were the first team since 2011 to make the playoffs despite finishing below .500 in the regular season.

The New York Knicks entered their third consecutive postseason. Their first round opponent, the Boston Celtics opened their postseason run just days after the Boston Marathon bombing, which occurred just blocks from where the Celtics play their games at TD Garden.

The Orlando Magic missed the playoffs for the first time since 2006, ending the longest active streak in the Eastern Conference. As a result, the Atlanta Hawks would own this distinction from 2013 to 2017.

First Round
Game 1 of the Bulls-Nets series marked the first time that Barclays Center hosted a playoff game. Game 7 of the same series also marked the 14th straight postseason with at least one Game 7. The 1999 NBA playoffs was the last time that a Game 7 was not played.

With their series sweep of the Milwaukee Bucks, the Miami Heat swept a playoff series for the first time since 2005. They also won every game by double digits.

Game 3 of the Knicks-Celtics series was the first Celtics home game since the Boston Marathon Bombings.

Game 4 of the Spurs-Lakers series was the final Lakers playoff game until 2020.

With their Game 6 win over the Boston Celtics, the New York Knicks won a playoff series for the first time since 2000.

Conference Semifinals
With Oklahoma City’s Game 5 loss to the Memphis Grizzlies in the Conference Semifinals, home court advantage in the Western Conference Finals went to the San Antonio Spurs, who were two games ahead of the Grizzlies. With the win, the Grizzlies made the conference finals for the first time in franchise history.

With their Game 6 win over the Golden State Warriors, the San Antonio Spurs returned to the Western Conference Finals for the second consecutive year.

With their Game 6 win over the New York Knicks, the Indiana Pacers made the Eastern Conference Finals for the first time since 2004. The Knicks would not return to the playoffs until 2021.

Conference Finals
By sweeping the Memphis Grizzlies in the Western Conference Finals, the San Antonio Spurs returned to the NBA Finals for the first time since 2007.

For the second consecutive postseason, the Eastern Conference Finals went to a Game 7. The Heat won the game, and earned their third straight berth in the NBA Finals.

NBA Finals
The 2013 NBA Finals were extremely notable for several reasons.

Game 2: LeBron James’ block of Tiago Splitter

Game 5: Danny Green setting an NBA Finals record for three pointers made in a series.

Game 6: The Miami Heat came back from a five point deficit with 28.2 seconds in regulation to win the game in overtime. The highlights of the comeback, Ray Allen’s game tying three pointer at the end of regulation and Chris Bosh’s game winning block against Danny Green, rated Game 6 of the 2013 NBA Finals as one of the greatest NBA Finals games ever played.

Game 7: The Miami Heat won their second consecutive NBA championship with a win over the San Antonio Spurs. The Spurs, on the other hand, lost an NBA Finals series for the first time in franchise history.

This was the last NBA Finals series ever played under NBA commissioner David Stern.

This was also the last time the NBA Finals were played in the 2–3–2 format. The format was reverted to the 2–2–1–1–1 format beginning in 2014.

Format

The six division winners and 10 other teams with the most wins from each conference qualified for the playoffs. The seedings are based on each team's record; however, a division winner is guaranteed to be ranked at least fourth, regardless of record.

Tiebreak procedures
The tiebreakers that determine seedings are:

 Division leader wins tie from team not leading a division
 Head-to-head record
 Division record (if all the tied teams are in the same division)
 Conference record
 Record vs. playoff teams, own conference
 Record vs. playoff teams, other conference (only in two-way tie)
 Point differential, all games

If there were more than two teams tied, the team that wins the tiebreaker gets the highest seed, while the other teams were "re-broken" from the first step until all ties were resolved. Since the three division winners were guaranteed a spot in the top four, ties to determine the division winners had to be broken before any other ties.

Playoff qualifying

Eastern Conference
{|class=wikitable style="font-size:95%; text-align:center;" width=70%
|-
!rowspan=2|Seed !!rowspan=2|Team !!rowspan=2|Record !!colspan=4|Clinched
|-
!Playoff berth !! Division title !! Best record in Conference !! Best record in NBA
|-
| 1 || align=left|Miami Heat || 66–16 || March 8 || March 18 || March 29 || April 10
|-
| 2 || align=left|New York Knicks || 54–28|| March 22 || April 9 || — || —
|-
| 3 || align=left|Indiana Pacers || 49-32 {{#tag:ref|In the aftermath of the Boston Marathon bombing, the NBA canceled the April 16 game scheduled in Boston between the Celtics and the Pacers; the game was not rescheduled because it would have had no impact on either team's playoff seedings.|group=lower-alpha|name=note_a}} || March 21 || April 7 || — || —
|-
| 4 || align=left|Brooklyn Nets || 49–33 || March 21 || — || — || —
|-
| 5 || align=left|Chicago Bulls || 45–37 || March 27 || — || — || —
|-
| 6 || align=left|Atlanta Hawks || 44–38 || March 27 || — || — || —
|-
| 7 || align=left|Boston Celtics || 41–40 || April 3 || — || — || —
|-
| 8 || align=left|Milwaukee Bucks || 38–44 || April 6 || — || — || —
|}— = Did not achieveWestern Conference— = Did not achieveNotes

Bracket
Teams in bold advanced to the next round. The numbers to the left of each team indicate the team's seeding in its conference, and the numbers to the right indicate the number of games the team won in that round. The division champions are marked by an asterisk. Home court advantage for the playoffs does not necessarily belong to the higher-seeded team, but instead the team with the better regular season record. Teams with home court advantage are shown in italics. If two teams with the same record meet in a round, standard tiebreaker rules are used. The doodle rule for determining home court advantage in the NBA Finals is head-to-head record followed by record vs. opposite conference.

First roundAll times are in Eastern Daylight Time (UTC−4)''

Eastern Conference first round

(1) Miami Heat vs. (8) Milwaukee Bucks

Regular-season series

This was the first playoff meeting between the Heat and the Bucks.

(2) New York Knicks vs. (7) Boston Celtics

Regular-season series

This was the 15th playoff meeting between these two teams, with the Celtics winning eight of the first 14 meetings.

(3) Indiana Pacers vs. (6) Atlanta Hawks

Regular-season series

This was the fifth playoff meeting between these two teams, with the each team winning two series apiece.

(4) Brooklyn Nets vs. (5) Chicago Bulls

The Nets led wire-to-wire as they routed the Bulls 106–89 to take a 1–0 series lead.  A dominant first half allowed the Nets to put the game away early as they outscored the Bulls 25–14 in the first quarter and 35–21 in the second quarter, building a 60–35 halftime lead.  

Following their embarrassing Game 1 loss, the Bulls bounced back with a 90–82 win, evening the series at 1–1 and stealing homecourt advantage.  The Bulls took control of the game in the third quarter, outscoring the Nets 22–11 in the period and building a 12-point 4th quarter lead.  The Nets attempted to rally, but the Bulls made enough clutch shots to hold them off.  After scoring 89 points through 3 quarters in Game 1 (and 106 for the game), the Nets were held to 82 points for all of Game 2.  

The Bulls took a 2–1 series lead with a 79–76 victory.  Despite squandering most of a huge fourth quarter lead, the Bulls hung on to win when Cj Watson airballed a game-tying three-pointer at the buzzer.

The Bulls stunned the Nets and took a commanding 3–1 series lead with a 142–134 victory in triple overtime.  The Nets trailed 58–55 at halftime.  However, they outscored the Bulls 29–18 in the third quarter and led by 8 points heading into the fourth quarter.  With less than 3 minutes to go, the Nets extended their lead to 14, and the Bulls trailed 109–95.  However, the Bulls would go on a 16–2 run to force the first of three overtimes.  Nate Robinson caught fire, scoring 23 points in the 4th quarter, including 12 unanswered points as the Bulls cut the deficit to 109–107 with just over one minute remaining.  Carlos Boozer then scored the game-tying bucket to even the game at 109.  On the Nets' next possession, Brook Lopez was fouled.  He made both free throws to put the Nets up 111–109.  The Bulls drew up a play to give Luol Deng a go-ahead corner three.  Deng missed the three, but Joakim Noah grabbed two offensive rebounds and tied the game at 111–111.  Deron Williams attempted to win the game at the end of regulation, but his shot rimmed out, and the Bulls forced overtime.  During the overtimes, several players fouled out.  For the Nets, Gerald Wallace and Reggie Evans would foul out while Robinson, Noah, and Gibson would foul out for the Bulls.  The Bulls would go on to win the game in triple overtime as they pushed the Nets to the brink of elimination.  

The Bulls entered this game without the services of Derrick Rose, Luol Deng, and Kirk Hinrich, but almost blew a 3–1 series lead to the Nets.  However, the Bulls dominated the first half, building a 61–44 halftime lead.  In the second half, the Nets fought back as they cut the deficit to 4, but they got no closer as the Bulls prevailed with a 99–93 victory.  It was the first time that the Bulls had won a Game 7 on the road in franchise history, becoming the 7th NBA road team to do so after leading series 3–1.  They were 0–6 in their last 6 road Game 7's. This was also Gerald Wallace's last game as a Net.   
Regular-season series

This was the second playoff meeting between these two teams, with the Bulls winning the first meeting. All previous meetings took place while the Nets were in New Jersey.

Western Conference first round

(1) Oklahoma City Thunder vs. (8) Houston Rockets

Regular-season series

This was the seventh playoff meeting between these two teams, with the Thunder/SuperSonics franchise winning five of the first six meetings. All previous meetings took place while the Thunder franchise were still known as the Seattle SuperSonics. In game 2, Russell Westbrook was injured.

(2) San Antonio Spurs vs. (7) Los Angeles Lakers

The Spurs dominated the Lakers in Game 1 and took a 1–0 series lead.

The Spurs dominated again in Game 2 and took a commanding 2–0 series lead.

The Spurs throttled the Lakers 120–89 and took a commanding 3–0 series lead.  For the Lakers, the 31-point loss represented the largest home playoff loss in franchise history.

The Spurs completed their sweep of the injury-depleted Lakers, routing them 103–82.  Dwight Howard picked up two technical fouls and was ejected in the third quarter.  It would end up being his final game in a Lakers jersey until his return to the team in 2019.  
Regular-season series

This was the 12th playoff meeting between these two teams, with the Lakers winning eight of the first 11 meetings.

(3) Denver Nuggets vs. (6) Golden State Warriors

In Game 1, Andre Miller hit the game-winning layup with 1.3 seconds left.

Regular-season series

This was the first playoff meeting between the Nuggets and the Warriors.

(4) Los Angeles Clippers vs. (5) Memphis Grizzlies

Regular-season series

This was the second playoff meeting between these two teams, with the Clippers winning the first meeting.

Conference semifinals

Eastern Conference semifinals

(1) Miami Heat vs. (5) Chicago Bulls

The Bulls stunned the Heat in Game 1 with a 93–86 victory.  The game was close throughout, with neither team leading by more than 8 points.
The Heat entered the fourth quarter with a 62–58 lead and led 86–83 with just over two minutes to play when the Bulls scored the game's final 10 points.
After giving up only 37 points in the first half, the Heat's defense allowed the Bulls to score 35 points in the 4th quarter alone.
After Marco Bellinelli's game-tying three-pointer knotted the game at 86, Nate Robinson took over, scoring two consecutive shots to put the Bulls up 90–86 with just over 40 seconds left.  On the Heat's next two possessions, LeBron James would shoot an airball and miss a long three-pointer, and Nate Robinson made enough free throws to seal the win and help the Bulls steal homecourt advantage. 

Regular-season series

This was the seventh playoff meeting between these two teams, with the Bulls winning four of the first six meetings.

(2) New York Knicks vs. (3) Indiana Pacers

Game 6 is Jason Kidd's final NBA game.

Regular-season series

This was the seventh playoff meeting between these two teams, with each team winning three series apiece.

Western Conference semifinals

(1) Oklahoma City Thunder vs. (5) Memphis Grizzlies

Regular-season series

This was the second playoff meeting between these two teams, with the Thunder winning the first meeting.

(2) San Antonio Spurs vs. (6) Golden State Warriors

Golden State led by 16 points with four minutes to go, but they would be hindered by missing eight of their last nine shots while the Spurs roared back to force overtime. The Spurs would come back without Tim Duncan, who had been bothered by a stomach virus and had to be in the locker room for the final 4:31 of regulation.  San Antonio finally tied the game on a Danny Green 3-pointer with 20 seconds left.  Stephen Curry (who scored 22 points in the 3rd quarter) would have a shot to win the game at the buzzer, but he missed a tightly contested 15-footer.  Manu Ginobili had a shot to potentially win the game at the end of the 1st overtime, but it was off the mark.  With 44 seconds on the game clock in double overtime, Ginobili missed a three-pointer that would have given the Spurs a six-point lead. Curry then made a two-point shot twelve seconds later to narrow the score to one. A missed layup by Tony Parker gave the Warriors the ball back; with three seconds to go, Kent Bazemore gave the Warriors the lead on a layup. However, Ginobili would shoot a three-pointer to give the Spurs the lead with one second remaining on the clock, and Jarrett Jack's running jumper shot missed at the buzzer to deliver a Spurs victory.

Regular-season series

This was the second playoff meeting between these two teams, with the Warriors winning the first meeting.

Conference finals

Eastern Conference finals

(1) Miami Heat vs. (3) Indiana Pacers

Paul George hit the game-tying 3 with 0.7 left to send the game into OT, and then in OT, LeBron James hit the game winning layup at the buzzer to seal the Game 1 victory in Miami. He also had 30 points, and added 10 rebounds, 10 assists (his ninth career playoff triple double, tying him with Wilt Chamberlain for fourth all-time), and three blocked shots—the first such stat line in a playoff game since Ralph Sampson in Game 5 of the 1986 Western Conference Semifinals.

Regular-season series

This was the third playoff meeting between these two teams, with each team winning one series apiece.

Western Conference finals

(2) San Antonio Spurs vs. (5) Memphis Grizzlies

This was the first sweep of any NBA conference finals series since 2003, when the New Jersey Nets swept the Detroit Pistons.
Regular-season series

This was the third playoff meeting between these two teams, with each team winning one series apiece.

NBA Finals: (E1) Miami Heat vs. (W2) San Antonio Spurs

Game 3 is Tracy McGrady's final NBA game.
In game 6, Allen hits 3-point corner with 5.2 seconds.

Regular-season series

This was the first playoff meeting between the Heat and the Spurs.

Statistical leaders

NBA Records
The following records were set or tied during the playoffs:

Overtime in Postseason: The Heat's 103–100 overtime win vs. San Antonio on June 18, 2013, improved their all-time postseason overtime record to 8–1 (.889). Their .889 postseason winning percentage is the best among teams with at least three overtime games played and the second-highest among all teams.
Double-Digit wins in Postseason: The Heat's 16-point, 109–93, win in Game Four of the NBA Finals on June 13, 2013, was Miami's 12th double-figure win in the 2013 postseason. The 12 double-digit wins are the most by any team during a single postseason in NBA history. (Spurs tied this record in the 2014 NBA playoffs and all 12 of those victories would also be by 15+ points) The previous record was 11, held by five different teams, each winning the NBA Championship that postseason.
Highest Field Goal Made Percentage, post season: Chris Andersen shot 80.7 percent (46-of-57) from the field in the 2013 postseason. He has become the first player in NBA postseason history to take at least 35 shots and shoot better than 75 percent from the field.
Consecutive Finals games over 30 points: LeBron James scored 32 points in Game Six of the NBA Finals on June 18, 2013, and then made 37 points in Game Seven on June 20, 2013. According to Elias Sports Bureau, he became the first player in NBA history to score consecutive 30-point games to help rally his team from a 3–2 series deficit to win an NBA title.
Game 7 over 30 Points: LeBron James finished the 2013 postseason by recording his fourth-straight 20-point Game Seven by scoring 37 points vs. the Spurs in the NBA Finals. He had previously scored 32 points vs. the Pacers on June 3, 2013, 31 points vs. the Celtics on June 9, 2012, and 45 points vs. the Celtics on May 18, 2008. The Elias Sports Bureau reports he has tied the record of the only other player to score at least 30 points in four consecutive Game 7's, Elgin Baylor (33 on 3/26/60, 39 on 4/1/61, 41 on 4/18/62, 35 on 4/11/63 and 33 on 4/15/66).
Highest scoring average in game sevens: LeBron James is averaging 34.4 points in Game 7's of the postseason during his career, currently the best average in NBA history.
Most 3-point FG in Postseason: Ray Allen owns the record for most 3-point field goals in the postseason – 385.
Most 4 point plays in a Finals game, 2: On June 16, 2013, Ray Allen converted two free throws after making three-point field goals, one at the 5:08 mark in the 2nd quarter, and the other with 8:37 left in the 4th quarter. There had previously been only 12 four point plays in the NBA Finals history.
Team Leader in Points, Rebounds, and Assists: LeBron James' 18 points, 18 rebounds and 10 assists vs. San Antonio on June 6, 2013, was the 28th time he has led his team outright (no ties) in each of those categories during the playoffs, the most in NBA postseason history. In addition, he has been the outright game-high leader (no ties) in each of those categories eight times, also the most in NBA postseason history. His eight such games are more than the combined total of the next three players to achieve the feat.
25-10-8: LeBron James' 32 points, 10 rebounds and 11 assists vs. SA on June 18, 2013, marked his 15th postseason 25-point, 10-rebound, eight-assist game, the most in NBA postseason history. According to Elias, second on this list is Oscar Robertson with 10 such games.
Most Three Pointers In A Final Series: On June 16, 2013, Danny Green converted 25 three-pointers through 5 games of the 2013 NBA Finals, breaking Ray Allen's record of 22 three-pointers that he had set in the 2008 Finals against the Los Angeles Lakers.  He extended the record to 27 three-pointers, converting two three-pointers (one per game) on June 18 and June 20.  However, the Heat won the series 4–3.

References

External links
2013 NBA Playoffs at NBA.com

Playoffs
National Basketball Association playoffs
ABS-CBN television specials

fi:NBA-kausi 2012–2013#Pudotuspelit